Crandal Mackey (December 15, 1865 – March 31, 1957), sometimes spelled Crandall, was an American lawyer and newspaper publisher. He served as the commonwealth attorney of Alexandria County, Virginia from 1904 to 1916, and led raids in Rosslyn, Virginia of gambling dens in 1904.

Early life
Crandal Mackey was born on December 15, 1865, in Shreveport, Louisiana to Thomas Jefferson Mackey. His father was a lawyer, captain of engineers during the Civil War and judge of a circuit court. Later, the family moved to Chester, South Carolina.

Mackey attended the North Carolina Military Institute. Mackey occasionally worked in cotton fields while growing up in South Carolina. The family moved to Washington, D.C. when he turned 18. He attended Randolph Macon College and participated in football and boxing sports while there. He graduated from the Georgetown University Law School with a law degree in 1889.

Career
In 1885, Mackey was appointed a clerk in the U.S. Department of War. He then became an examiner of pensions and started to practice law. On June 21, 1898, Mackey was appointed a captain of the 10th U.S. Volunteer Infantry Regiment during the Spanish–American War. After the war, he returned to practicing law in Washington, D.C.

Mackey was elected as the commonwealth attorney of Alexandria County, Virginia by one vote in 1904. He ran as the anti-gambling candidate against Dick Johnson. He assumed office in January 1904 and served until 1916, replaced by Frank L. Ball. While commonwealth attorney, he led raids on gambling dens and houses in Rosslyn, Jackson City and St. Asaph's in May 1904. Frank Lyon was also a member of the raids. The raids caused gambling houses in Rosslyn and Jackson City to shutter, including the poolroom at St. Asaph Racetrack.

Mackey was opposed to the county manager style of government that Arlington County imposed in 1930. He later ran for the U.S. Congress in 1930, on a platform of states' rights and calling for the repeal of the 18th Amendment in favor of statewide control of liquor. He lost the Democratic primary to Howard W. Smith.

Mackey was an editor and publisher of a newspaper in Arlington called The Chronicle. He was one of the charter members of the Arlington County Bar Association. He was also a director of the Arlington National Bank and the National Mortgage and Investment Company. He was one of the organizers of the Arlington Trust Company and was a member of the Board of Trustees of George Washington University.

Personal life
Mackey married Mary, and had seven children, including Argyle, Joseph, Darlington, Thomas, Alice and Virginia. Mackey lived on a hill above Rosslyn called "Mackey's Hill".

Mackey moved to Alexandria County around 1896. Mackey and his family were in an automobile accident in 1912. Mackey jumped out of his car before it fell over an embankment. He later broke his hip in an automobile accident in 1951.

Death
Mackey died on March 31, 1957. He was buried at Arlington National Cemetery.

Legacy
Virginia would later assume statewide control over liquor, a stance that Mackey supported later in his career.

Arlington County named a 70,000 square foot park after Mackey on the block where Mackey shut down gambling houses. In 2014, Crandal Mackey Park was replaced by the Central Place housing development.

References

External links

1865 births
1957 deaths
People from Shreveport, Louisiana
People from Arlington County, Virginia
Georgetown University Law Center alumni
United States Department of War officials
American military personnel of the Spanish–American War
Virginia Democrats
County and city Commonwealth's Attorneys in Virginia
Virginia lawyers
19th-century American lawyers
20th-century American lawyers
20th-century American newspaper publishers (people)
American temperance activists